Bigla is a village in the municipality of Delčevo, North Macedonia.

Demographics
As of the 2002 census, the village had a total of 274 inhabitants. Ethnic groups in the village include Macedonians and Serbs.

References

Villages in Delčevo Municipality